Lower Cove may refer to:

 Lower Cove, Happy Adventure, Newfoundland and Labrador, Canada
 Ship Cove-Lower Cove-Jerry's Nose, Newfoundland and Labrador, Canada
Lower Cove, Nova Scotia, Canada

See also

 Lower Island Cove